Sam Reed (October 18, 1935 – July 7, 2021) was a tenor saxophonist based in Philadelphia.

Working at the Uptown Theater in the late 1950s and early 1960s, he added jazz and rhythm & blues shows to what was at the time an R&B, blues and rock and roll venue. For some years, Reed was also musical director for Teddy Pendergrass, and in the early 1970s, he was the "horn contractor" for Gamble and Huff's Philadelphia International Records.

Bootsie Barnes, Mickey Roker and Jimmy Oliver are among the other Philadelphia-based musicians he has performed with.

In 2012, he received the Jazz Journalists Association's annual Jazz Heroes Award.

Discography

As sideman
1958: "Get a Job" The Silhouettes
1969: Soul Summit - The Ambassadors
1970: When We Get Married - The Intruders
1970: Brand New Me - Dusty Springfield
1971: Gonna Take a Miracle - Laura Nyro and LaBelle
1971: Going East - Billy Paul
1981: It's Time for Love -  Teddy Pendergrass
2013: Ready for Reed - Sam Reed Meets Roberto Magris (JMood, 2013)

References

1935 births
2021 deaths
American jazz saxophonists
American male saxophonists
21st-century American saxophonists
21st-century American male musicians
American male jazz musicians
People from Kingstree, South Carolina
20th-century American saxophonists